The Bed Sitting Room is a 1969 British comedy film directed by Richard Lester, starring an ensemble cast of British comic actors, and based on the play of the same name. It was entered into the 19th Berlin International Film Festival. The film is an absurdist, post-apocalyptic, satirical black comedy.

Plot
The film is set in London on the third or fourth anniversary of a nuclear war that killed 40 million, and lasted two minutes and 28 seconds, including the time taken to sign the peace treaty. It is not clear who dropped the bomb. Three (or possibly four) years after the nuclear holocaust, the survivors wander amidst the debris. Most characters avoid naming the "bomb" throughout.

Captain Bules Martin, who holds a "Defeat of England" medal as he was unable to save Buckingham Palace from disintegration during the war is also referred to as Doctor by Lord Fortnum who acts for a prescription for malnourishment, but fears he's turning into a bed sitting room. When Martin confirms it, Lord Fortnum gets a second opinion from the "National Health Service", a male nurse overwhelmed by the extent of the war's aftermath.

Penelope, who lives in a tube train on the (still functioning) Circle line with her parents, gets caught in bed with her fiancé Alan, who then joins their party. It is said that Penelope is pregnant. In search of a nurse, they leave the train taking a trunk so they won't look like vagrants, unknowingly carrying a living man who's been ready to be collected as dead for three years.

Two policemen who hover overhead in the shell of a Morris Minor Panda car that has been made into a makeshift balloon and shout "keep moving" at any survivors they see to offset the danger of them becoming a target in the unlikely event of another outbreak of hostilities.

Martin finds Shelter Man, a Regional Seat of Government who survived the war in a fallout shelter and spends his days looking at old films (without a projector) and reminiscing about the time he shot his wife and his mother as they pleaded with him to let them into his shelter. His current wife Doris (a picture of a shirtless woman attached to the wall) holds food and they share. Shelter Man reveals that he saw evidence that they dipped the bombs in germs to infect the population with measles to kill them off.

National Health Service stalks Penelope and her family and gives Mother her death certificate although she's still alive, and attempts to capture her with a net. Mother wanders away from her family, slips into Shelter Man's home, and transforms into a cupboard.

Lord Fortnum calls Martin, informing him that he is at 29 Cul de Sac Place, and actually does become a bed-sitting room. Mate, a fireguard with nothing left to burn, tricks Martin into leaving so he can move furniture inside. Character "Mao Tse-tung", or Chinaman moves Mother into the room.

Father is measured by the Police and Martin asks to court Penelope. Despite her love for Alan, Father agrees to Martin as it will help him when he becomes Prime Minister, a position he is believed to get "his inside leg measurements". Penelope is uninterested in the date. They hold the wedding ceremony at St Paul's Cathedral, which is mostly submerged underwater. Underwater Vicar weds them. Martin runs off to get his virility test, leaving Penelope, who soon goes into labour. Father is selected to become the Prime Minister.

National Health Service insists that Penelope's baby stay in her womb, but she delivers it. When she shows it to her father, he is found to be transformed into a parrot. Penelope learns that the cupboard is her mother.

Father kills himself and his body is cooked due to the starvation conditions that prevail. Mate warns everyone of the radiation and people head inside the bed-sitting room. Penelope and Alan find their baby dead. Rubber Man repents as the Police knock down the bed-sitting room, Lord Fortnum speaks up and impersonates God, but is quickly shut down by Martin.

The police bring back the chest and reunite Nigel with Martin. Penelope is pregnant with her next child, which is normal and healthy. The Police Inspector delivers a speech as an indication of hope for the future of the country amidst the devastation when it transpires that a team of surgeons have developed a cure for the mutations involving full-body transplant. Finally, a military band pays homage to Mrs. Ethel Shroake of 393A High Street, Leytonstone, the late Queen's former charwoman, and closest in succession to the throne.

Cast

Ralph Richardson as Lord Fortnum of Alamein
Rita Tushingham as Penelope
Michael Hordern as Bules Martin
Arthur Lowe as Father 
Mona Washbourne as Mother
Peter Cook as Police Inspector
Dudley Moore as Police Sergeant
Spike Milligan as Mate
Harry Secombe as Shelter Man
Marty Feldman as Nurse Arthur
Jimmy Edwards as Nigel
Roy Kinnear as Plastic Mac Man
Ronald Fraser as The Army
Richard Warwick as Alan
Frank Thornton as The BBC
Dandy Nichols as Mrs Ethel Shroake
Jack Shepherd as Underwater Vicar
Henry Woolf as Electricity Man
Cecil Cheng as Chinaman
Bill Wallis as The Prime Minister
Ronnie Brody as The Chauffeur

Production
After completing Petulia, Richard Lester had intended his next film to be Up Against It, which was written by playwright Joe Orton, but Orton was murdered shortly before production. Lester offered this to United Artists as a replacement. It was filmed between May and July 1968, mainly in and around Chobham Common. When the executives at United Artists saw the film, they hated it, and it was shelved for a year, only getting its first release at the Berlin International Film Festival in 1969. It wasn't released in the UK until March 1970.  The Bed Sitting Room would be the last film released by United Artists' foreign film arm Lopert Pictures Corporation, which folded in 1970.

Set design
The absurdity of the film extends even to the settings. One scene is shot beside a pile upon which a British pottery firm had been throwing rejected plates since World War II (the joke being that an actor is looking for a dish that isn't broken). Another set of the film is a mock triumphal arch made of appliance doors, beneath which a Mrs. Ethel Shroake ("of 393A High Street, Leytonstone"), the closest in line for the throne, is mounted on a horse. Even the opening credits have a touch of the absurd, listing the cast not by appearance or alphabetically, but by height.

Release and reception
The film was entered into the 19th Berlin International Film Festival in July 1969, and Richard Lester received the C.I.D.A.L.C. Gandhi Award for it.

On 26 March 1970, the film premiered in London at the CineCenta Cinema on Panton Street (today Odeon Panton Street), which was Europe's first multi-screen cinema. 
John Russell Taylor in The Times found the film both funny and frightening, but lacking ideas enough for a whole feature film: "Precisely the same objection applies to the film as applied to the play: that it is based on one of those ideas which are fine in themselves but suffer from the drawback that once you have stated them, all you can do is state them again, louder".

DVD and Blu-ray Disc releases
The British Film Institute (BFI) have released The Bed Sitting Room on DVD and Blu-ray Disc through its Flipside line.

See also 
 The Bedsitting Room (play)
 List of apocalyptic and post-apocalyptic fiction

References

External links

 
 

1969 films
1969 comedy films
1969 drama films
1960s black comedy films
1960s pregnancy films
1960s satirical films
1960s science fiction comedy-drama films
1960s English-language films
British satirical films
British black comedy films
British science fiction comedy-drama films
British post-apocalyptic films
British pregnancy films
Films directed by Richard Lester
Films about nuclear war and weapons
Films set in London
Works by Spike Milligan
Films scored by Ken Thorne
1960s British films